Kieran Gorman (born 30 July 1987 in Joondalup, Perth, Western Australia) is an Australian aerobic gymnast. He is the 2010 International Federation of Gymnastics World Series Champion and multiple international medalist. Gorman is the first gymnast in Australian history to be World Ranked number 1 in all gym sport disciplines.

References

1987 births
Living people
Sportspeople from Perth, Western Australia
Australian aerobic gymnasts
Male aerobic gymnasts
Medalists at the Aerobic Gymnastics World Championships